Our Spirits Don't Speak English (2008) is a documentary film about Native American boarding schools attended by young people mostly from the mid-19th to the mid-20th centuries. It was filmed by the Rich Heape company and directed by Chip Richie. Native American storyteller Gayle Ross narrated the film. Ross is a descendant of John Ross, chief of the Cherokee Nation in the Trail of Tears period.

The film deals with both the schools run by Christian missionaries and those run by the United States' Bureau of Indian Affairs. It addresses the schools' role in forcing cultural assimilation of the resident children into the ways of the majority culture of European Americans.

See also
Where the Spirit Lives, a 1989 Canadian dramatic film about the Canadian Indian residential school system
Sleeping Children Awake, a 1992 Canadian documentary about residential schools
We Were Children, a 2012 Canadian documentary about residential schools

Notes

External links
 

2008 films
2008 documentary films
Assimilation of indigenous peoples of North America
Documentary films about education in the United States
Documentary films about indigenous rights
Native American boarding schools
Documentary films about Native Americans